Clare Murray (born 1988) is an Australian team handball player. She plays on the Australian national team, and participated at the 2011 World Women's Handball Championship in Brazil.

References

1988 births
Living people
Australian female handball players